Richard Zussman (born September 2, 1983) is a Canadian television reporter. He works for Global BC as an online journalist based at the Legislative Assembly of British Columbia. He is a former reporter for the CBC based in Victoria. He was dismissed as legislature reporter in early December 2017, for co-writing (with Rob Shaw) the book A Matter of Confidence about the fall of Christy Clark's British Columbia Liberal Party. He is a former TV personality on Citytv in Edmonton, where he served the political reporter/videographer for Breakfast Television and a former videojournalist and on-air pundit for the Sun News Network in Vancouver.

Biography 
Zussman was born and raised in Ottawa, Ontario, where he became interested in politics at a young age. He received his undergraduate degree in political studies from Queen's University in Kingston, Ontario in 2006. He went on to the Newhouse School of Public Communications at Syracuse University, where he completed his master's in Broadcast Journalism.

While at Syracuse, Zussman travelled to New Hampshire to cover the historic 2008 presidential primary for KUAR, an NPR radio station in Little Rock, Arkansas. He travelled with former Arkansas Governor Mike Huckabee on his campaign bus and reported on a group of Little Rock volunteers supporting Hillary Clinton who were left out in the cold after their hotel burned down.

In the summer of 2008, Zussman worked in Washington, D.C., as a television reporter for KTAL in Shreveport, Louisiana, covering the senate race between John Kennedy and incumbent Mary Landrieu. He also covered sports at WBNG-TV in New York.

Zussman joined City Edmonton in November 2008.

Zussman has also been involved with community philanthropic endeavours. In December 2018, he served as Lieutenant Governor of the 90th Session of the British Columbia Youth Parliament, a non-profit, non-denominational youth-run organization that combines education about the Westminster system of Parliament with the promotion of youth service in the community.

References

1983 births
Living people
Canadian male journalists
Canadian television journalists
CBC Television people
Journalists from Ontario
Queen's University at Kingston alumni
Syracuse University alumni
People from Ottawa